Algiers is the eponymous debut album by American experimental band Algiers. The album was released through Matador Records on June 2, 2015.

Critical reception

Algiers received positive feedback from contemporary music critics upon release. At Metacritic, which assigns a normalized rating out of 100 to reviews from mainstream critics, the album received an average score of 79, based on 13 reviews, which indicates "generally favorable reviews".

In his review for AllMusic, Thom Jurek stated that, "Algiers, both band and album, offer musical and topical intensity alternately malevolent and passionate in searching and affirming truth, human and otherworldly. All of these seemingly disparate historical musical elements are distilled in such a startling manner, they carve something new from the fragments. This is a stunning debut."

Accolades

Track listing

Personnel
All personnel credits adapted from Algiers album notes.

Algiers
Franklin James Fisher – lead vocals, backing vocals, guitar, piano, rhodes, wurlitzer, percussion, cello, drums, sampling
Ryan Mahan – bass, TR-808, Juno-6, ARP String Ensemble, Prophet-5, wurlitzer, programming, percussion, guitar, backing vocals
Lee Tesche – guitar, prepared piano, prepared guitar, programming, percussion, backing vocals

Additional musicians
Natalie Judge – backing vocals (8)

Technical
Tom Morris – producer, mixing
Carl Saff – mastering

Design
Nicola Morrison – cover and interior paintings
Lamb & Sea – design
Sam Campbell – photography
Brad Feuerhelm – photography

References

External links
 Algiers LP

2015 debut albums
Algiers (band) albums
Matador Records albums